The Hilbert Circle Theatre, originally called the Circle Theatre, is in Indianapolis, Indiana, on Monument Circle. It was built in 1916 and consists of a Neoclassical style, white glazed terra cotta entrance section with a brick auditorium section behind. The front façade is slightly curved.  It was originally built as a "deluxe movie palace."

Reopening on October 12, 1984, the Circle Theatre is home to the Indianapolis Symphony Orchestra. In December 1996, it was renamed the Hilbert Circle Theatre after being endowed by Stephen Hilbert, founder of CNO Financial Group, and his wife Tomisue. The theatre holds 1,660 seats and has space for an 87-member ensemble. It is now home to a 3-manual 24-rank Wurlitzer theatre organ.

It was listed on the National Register of Historic Places in 1980. It is located in the Washington Street-Monument Circle Historic District.

Notable events
The theatre hosted the Weightlifting Competition during the 1987 Pan American Games. The venue hosted NBC's Late Night with Jimmy Fallon for a week of episodes during Super Bowl XLVI in 2012.

References

External links

Official website
Circle Theater (Hilbert Circle Theatre) from Indianapolis, a Discover Our Shared Heritage Travel Itinerary

Individually listed contributing properties to historic districts on the National Register in Indiana
Theatres on the National Register of Historic Places in Indiana
Neoclassical architecture in Indiana
Theatres completed in 1916
Theatres in Indiana
Music venues in Indiana
National Register of Historic Places in Indianapolis
Public venues with a theatre organ